United Nations Security Council resolution 773, adopted on 26 August 1992, after recalling resolutions 687 (1991) and 689 (1991), the Council considered the work of the Iraq–Kuwait Boundary Demarcation Commission established on 2 May 1991, and reiterated its position that it would enforce any violation of the ceasefire in the demilitarised zone.

The council stressed that the commission was not to reallocate territory on the border, but for the first time is demarcating the boundary set out in the "Agreed Minutes between the State of Kuwait and the Republic of Iraq regarding the restoration of Friendly Relations, Recognition and Related Matters" signed on 4 October 1963 by Iraq and Kuwait. It also welcomed the decision of the commission to consider the eastern section of the boundary at its next session and urged for it to be demarcated as soon as possible. The commission completed its work in November 1992.

The resolution was adopted by 14 votes to none, while Ecuador abstained.

See also
 Gulf War
 Invasion of Kuwait
 Kuwait–Iraq barrier
 List of United Nations Security Council Resolutions 701 to 800 (1991–1993)

References

External links
 
Text of the Resolution at undocs.org

 0773
 0773
1992 in Iraq
1992 in Kuwait
Iraq and weapons of mass destruction
 0773
Iraq–Kuwait border
August 1992 events